Christmas with Carnie is a Christmas album by American pop singer Carnie Wilson, released in 2007. The album contains one new song, "Warm Lovin' Christmastime", a duet between Wilson and her husband Rob Bonfiglio, who wrote the song.

Track listing
"Merry Christmas Darling" (Richard Carpenter, Pooler) - 3:19
"Sleigh Ride" (Anderson/Parish) - 2:28
"Silent Night" (Josef Mohr, Franz Gruber) (Featuring Wendy Wilson) - 3:37
"Jingle Bells" (James Pierpont) - 2:49
"I'll Be Home for Christmas" (Walter Kent) - 3:59
"Warm Lovin' Christmastime" (Rob Bonfiglio) (Duet with Rob Bonfiglio) - 3:20
"Blue Christmas" (Hayes, Johnson) - 3:26
"Rudolph the Red-Nosed Reindeer" (Johnny Marks) - 2:30
"White Christmas" (Irving Berlin) - 3:48
"Santa Baby" (Javits, Springer, Springer) - 2:39
"Rockin' Around the Christmas Tree" (Johnny Marks) - 1:53
"The Christmas Song" (Tormé, Wells) - 3:34

Personnel
 Carnie Wilson – lead and backing vocals, vocal arrangements 
 Rob Bonfiglio – guitars, rhythm arrangements, backing vocals (1), lead vocals (6)
 Biff Watson – acoustic guitar 
 Jimmy Nichols – keyboards, programming 
 Owen Elliot Kugell – backing vocals (2, 11)
 Wendy Wilson – harmony vocals (3)
 The Honeys – backing vocals (4)

Carnie Wilson albums
2007 Christmas albums
Christmas albums by American artists
Pop Christmas albums
Albums produced by Richard Landis